The Count of Bragelonne (French: Le Vicomte de Bragelonne, Italian: Il Visconte di Bragelonne)  is a 1954 Franco-Italian film directed by Fernando Cerchio. It is a film adaptation of the novel Le Vicomte de Bragelonne by Alexandre Dumas père. Its cast included Dawn Addams, Georges Marchal and Jacques Dumesnil.

It was shot at the Billancourt Studios in Paris. The film's sets were designed by the art director Roland Quignon.

Synopsis
Raoul de Bragelonne, son of the musketeer Athos, returns to France from a mission to England to find that his lover Louise de la Vallière is now mistress of Louis XIV. Instead he now falls in love with Hélène de Winter and with the assistance of D'Artagnan foils a plot by Cardinal Mazarin to put the King's secret twin brother on the throne.

Cast
 Georges Marchal as Raoul de Bragelonne
 Dawn Addams as Hélène de Winter
 Jacques Dumesnil as d'Artagnan
 Franco Silva as Boissière
 Florence Arnaud as Louise de la Vallière
 Robert Burnier as Athos
 André Falcon as Louis XIV 
 Philippe Olive as Porthos
 Nico Pepe as Mazarin 
 Jean Tissier as Planchet
 Nicolas Amato as Le chambellan
 Jean Clarieux as Un paysan
 René Hell as Un paysan
 Robert Le Fort as Un garde
 Gina Manès as Une paysanne

References

Bibliography
 Klossner, Michael. The Europe of 1500-1815 on Film and Television: A Worldwide Filmography of Over 2550 Works, 1895 Through 2000. McFarland & Company, 2002.

External links

Films based on The Vicomte of Bragelonne: Ten Years Later
French historical drama films
Italian historical drama films
1954 films
Films with screenplays by Roland Laudenbach
1950s historical drama films
1954 drama films
Films shot at Billancourt Studios
1950s Italian films
1950s French films